Robert Henry Cerv (May 5, 1925 – April 6, 2017) was an American professional baseball left fielder. Prior to his professional career, he was a collegiate baseball and basketball player at the University of Nebraska. He was born in Weston, Nebraska and served in the U.S. Navy during World War II.

Career
Cerv signed with the New York Yankees in 1950 and was a little-used reserve outfielder on the perennially World Series-bound Yankee teams of the early 1950s. According to sportswriter Robert Creamer, interviewed for the Ken Burns series Baseball, one afternoon in 1956, Yankees manager Casey Stengel approached Cerv in the Yankees' dugout, sat down nearby, and commented, "There's not many people that know this, but one of us has been traded to Kansas City." However, this sequence of events did not really happen. In fact, Cerv was sold for cash to the Kansas City Athletics on October 15, 1956, five days after the Yankees had ended the 1956 World Series with a Game 7 victory over the Dodgers at Ebbets Field. By the 15th, the dugouts and clubhouse at Yankee Stadium had all been emptied and the players returned home.

Cerv prospered as a regular in Kansas City. His best season was 1958, when he hit .305, hit 38 homers, and had 104 RBIs. He was elected to the American League All-Star team, beating out Ted Williams for the starting spot. He also finished fourth in the MVP voting that year. He did all of this while playing injured part of the season. He followed up in 1959 with 20 homers and 87 RBIs. On August 20, 1959, Cerv hit three home runs against the Boston Red Sox in an 11–10 loss. 

In May 1960, Cerv was traded back to the Yankees for Andy Carey. During that year's spring training, Cerv participated in the TV series Home Run Derby, where he defeated Frank Robinson. Following the 1960 season, he was drafted by the Los Angeles Angels in the expansion draft and was in the starting lineup for the Angel franchise's inaugural game on April 11, 1961. In May 1961, he was traded back to the Yankees, where he was a substitute and pinch hitter. In June 1962 he was sold to the Houston Colt .45s, who released him in August.

During the 1961 season, Cerv lived in a $251-per-month apartment in Queens with Mickey Mantle and Roger Maris.

In his career, Cerv had a .276 batting average and 105 home runs, including 12 pinch hit homers. He had 624 hits in 2261 at-bats. Following Cerv's big league career, he coached college baseball at Southeast Missouri State College and John F. Kennedy College in Wahoo, Nebraska, where he also coached the men's basketball team.

Cerv died on April 6, 2017 in Blair, Nebraska, aged 91.

In media
Cerv was portrayed by actor Chris Bauer in 61*, a 2001 HBO movie directed by Billy Crystal about the 1961 New York Yankees season in which Roger Maris and Mickey Mantle attempted to break the single-season record of 60 home runs established by Babe Ruth in 1927.

Notes

References

External links

Bob Cerv Oral History Interview (1 of 3) – National Baseball Hall of Fame Digital Collection
Bob Cerv Oral History Interview (2 of 3) – National Baseball Hall of Fame Digital Collection
Bob Cerv Oral History Interview (3 of 3) – National Baseball Hall of Fame Digital Collection

1925 births
2017 deaths
All-American college baseball players
American League All-Stars
American men's basketball players
Baseball players from Nebraska
Houston Colt .45s players
Kansas City Athletics players
Kansas City Blues (baseball) players
Los Angeles Angels players
Major League Baseball outfielders
Nebraska Cornhuskers baseball players
Nebraska Cornhuskers men's basketball players
New York Yankees players
People from Saunders County, Nebraska
United States Navy personnel of World War II